Aleiro is a Local Government Area in Kebbi State, Nigeria. Its headquarters are in the town of Aliero.

It has an area of 350 km and a population of 65,973 at the 2006 census.

The postal code of the area is 863.

References

Local Government Areas in Kebbi State